Preloge is a small settlement in the hills northwest of Semič in southeastern Slovenia. The area is part of the historical region of Lower Carniola. The Municipality of Semič is now included in the Southeast Slovenia Statistical Region.

References

External links
Preloge at Geopedia

Populated places in the Municipality of Semič